The Indian National Satellite System or INSAT, is a series of multipurpose geostationary satellites launched by ISRO to satisfy the telecommunications, broadcasting, meteorology, and search and rescue operations. Commissioned in 1983, INSAT is the largest domestic communication system in the Indo-Pacific Region. It is a joint venture of the Department of Space, Department of Telecommunications, India Meteorological Department, All India Radio and Doordarshan. The overall coordination and management of INSAT system rests with the Secretary-level INSAT Coordination Committee.

INSAT satellites provide transponders in various bands to serve the television and communication needs of India. Some of the satellites also have the Very High Resolution Radiometer (VHRR), CCD cameras for meteorological imaging. The satellites also incorporate transponder(s) for receiving distress alert signals for search and rescue missions in the South Asian and Indian Ocean Region, as ISRO is a member of the Cospas-Sarsat program.

INSAT system

The Indian National Satellite (INSAT) system was commissioned with the launch of INSAT-1B in August 1983 (INSAT-1A, the first satellite was launched in April 1982 but could not fulfil the mission). INSAT system ushered in a revolution in India's television and radio broadcasting, telecommunications and meteorological sectors. It enabled the rapid expansion of TV and modern telecommunication facilities to even the remote areas and off-shore islands. Together, the system provides transponders in C, Extended C and Ku bands for a variety of communication services. Some of the INSATs also carry instruments for meteorological observation and data relay for providing meteorological services. KALPANA-1 is an exclusive meteorological satellite. The satellites are monitored and controlled by Master Control Facilities that exist in Hassan and Bhopal.

Satellites in service
Of the 24 satellites launched in the course of the INSAT program, 11 are still in operation.

INSAT-2E

It is the last of the six  five satellites in INSAT-2 series. It carries seventeen C-band and lower extended C-band transponders providing zonal and global coverage with an Effective Isotropic Radiated Power (EIRP) of 36 dBW. It also carries a Very High Resolution Radiometer (VHRR) with imaging capacity in the visible (0.55–0.75 μm), thermal infrared (10.5–12.5 μm) and water vapour (5.7–7.1 μm) channels and provides 2x2 km, 8x8 km ground resolution respectively. In addition to the above two payloads it has with it a Charge Coupled Device (CCD) camera providing 1x1 km ground resolution in the Visible (0.63–0.69 μm), Near Infrared (0.77–0.86 μm) and Shortwave Infrared (1.55–1.70 μm) bands.

INSAT-3A

The multipurpose satellite, INSAT-3A, was launched by Ariane in April 2003. It is located at 93.5 degree East longitude. The payloads on INSAT-3A are as follows:
12 Normal C-band transponders (9 channels provide expanded coverage from Middle East to South East Asia with an EIRP of 38 dBW, 3 channels provide India coverage with an EIRP of 36 dBW and 6 Extended C-band transponders provide India coverage with an EIRP of 36 dBW).
6 Ku band transponders provide India coverage with EIRP of 48 dBW.
Very High Resolution Radiometer (VHRR) with imaging capacity in the visible (0.55–0.75 μm), infrared (10.5–12.5 μm) and water vapour (5.7–7.1 μm) channels, provide 2x2 km, 8x8 km and 8x8 km ground resolutions respectively.
A CCD camera provides 1x1 km ground resolution, in the visible (0.63–0.69 μm), near infrared (0.77–0.86 μm) and shortwave infrared (1.55–1.70 μm) bands.
A Data Relay Transponder (DRT) having global receive coverage with a 400 MHz uplink and 4500 MHz downlink for relay of meteorological, hydrological and oceanographic data from unattended land and ocean-based automatic data collection-cum-transmission platforms.
A Satellite Aided Search and Rescue (SAS&R) SARP payload having global receive coverage with 406 MHz uplink and 4500 MHz downlink with India coverage, for relay of signals from distress beacons in sea, air or land.  See also Cospas-Sarsat.

INSAT-3C

Launched in January 2002, INSAT-3C is positioned at 74 degree East longitude. INSAT-3C payloads include 24 Normal C-band transponders providing an EIRP of 37 dBW, six Extended C-band transponders with EIRP of 37 dBW, two S-band transponders to provide BSS services with 42 dBW EIRP and an MSS payload similar to that on INSAT-3B. All the transponders provide coverage over India.

INSAT-3D

Launched in July 2013, INSAT-3D is positioned at 82 Degree East longitude. INSAT-3D payloads include Imager, Sounder, Data Relay Transponder and Search & Rescue Transponder. All the transponders provide coverage over large part of the Indian Ocean
region covering India, Bangladesh, Bhutan, Maldives, Nepal, Seychelles, Sri Lanka and Tanzania for rendering distress alert services.

INSAT-3DR

INSAT-3DR is a weather satellite meant to provide meteorological services to India using a 6-channel imager and a 19-channel sounder, it was launched on 9 September 2016 by the GSLV Mk II F05, and is a follow-up to INSAT-3D.

INSAT-3E

Launched in September 2003, INSAT-3E is positioned at 55 degree East longitude and carries 24 Normal C-band transponders provide an edge of coverage EIRP of 37 dBW over India and 12 Extended C-band transponders provide an edge of coverage EIRP of 38 dBW over India.
The satellite has been decommissioned and gone out of service from April 2014. GSAT-16 will replace this satellite.

KALPANA-1

KALPANA-1 is an exclusive meteorological satellite launched by PSLV in September 2002. It carries Very High Resolution Radiometer and DRT payloads to provide meteorological services. It is located at 74 degree East longitude. Its first name was METSAT. It was later renamed as KALPANA-1 to commemorate Kalpana Chawla.

INSAT-4 Series

INSAT-4A

Launched in December 2005 by the European Ariane launch vehicle, INSAT-4A is positioned at 83 degree East longitude along with INSAT-2E and INSAT-3B. INSAT-A carries 12 Ku band 36 MHz bandwidth transponders employing 140 W TWTAs to provide an EIRP of 52 dBW at the edge of coverage polygon with footprint covering Indian main land and 12 C-band 36 MHz bandwidth transponders provide an EIRP of 39 dBW at the edge of coverage with expanded radiation patterns encompassing Indian geographical boundary, area beyond India in southeast and northwest regions. Tata Sky, a joint venture between the TATA Group and STAR uses INSAT-4A for distributing their DTH service.

INSAT-4B

It was launched in March 2007 by the European Ariane launch vehicle. Configured with payloads identical to that of INSAT-4A, INSAT-4B carries 12 Ku band and 12 C-band transponders to provide EIRP of 52 dBW and 39 dBW respectively. Two Tx/Rx dual grid offset fed shaped beam reflectors of 2.2 m diameter for Ku band and 2 m diameter for C-band are used. INSAT-4B augments the high power transponder capacity over India in Ku band and over a wider region in C-band. It is co-located with INSAT-3A at 93.5 degree E longitude.

The national space agency Indian Space Research Organisation (ISRO) has allotted nearly seven Ku band transponders to Sun Direct; a DTH service provider from South India, and the other five to Doordarshan's DD Direct Plus. 12 transponders in the C band are for TV, radio and telecommunication purposes.

The satellite was decommissioned on 24 January 2022. The satellite was moved to a disposal orbit, 340 km above geostationary orbit.

China-Stuxnet Connection 

American cyber warfare expert Jeffrey Carr, who specialises in investigations of cyber attacks against government, mentioned in his interview with The Times of India, that the reason for this power glitch may have been an infection by the sophisticated Stuxnet worm. He attributed the development of Stuxnet worm most likely to Government of China which had the necessary sophistication to develop the bug and would gain the maximum by failure of Indian satellite. He also pointed out that Stuxnet was discovered just a month before the Indian satellite was hit by the power glitch, the reason for which still remains unknown. ISRO uses the same Siemens software that was targeted by Stuxnet.

INSAT-4CR

INSAT-4CR was launched on 2 September 2007 by GSLV-F04. It is a replacement satellite of INSAT-4C which was lost when GSLV-F02 failed and had to be destroyed on its course. It carries 12 Ku band 36 MHz bandwidth transponders employing 140 W TWTAs to provide an Effective Isotropic Radiated Power of 51.5 dBW at Edge of Coverage with footprint covering Indian mainland. It also incorporates a Ku band Beacon as an aid to tracking the satellite.

On 8 September 2007 ISRO reported the satellite had reached a near geosynchronous orbit, and would be stabilized in its intended orbital position of 74 degrees E longitude by 15 September. The satellite is designed for a mission life in of ten years. There were reports that the mission life of the satellite had decreased by five years as the thrusters had to burn this much fuel to restore the satellite to its correct orbit. However, the ISRO later refuted this claim dismissing it as false.

GSAT Series 
The GSAT satellites are India's indigenously developed communications satellites, used for digital audio, data and video broadcasting for both military and civilian users. As of November 2018, 19 GSAT satellites of ISRO have been launched out of which 15 satellites are currently in service.

GSAT-2

Launched by the second flight of GSLV in May 2003, GSAT-2 is located at 48 degree East longitude and carries four Normal C-band transponders to provide 36 dBW EIRP with India coverage, two Ku band transponders with 42 dBW EIRP over India and an MSS payload similar to those on INSAT-3B and INSAT-3C.

GSAT-3 

Configured for audio-visual medium employing digital interactive classroom lessons and multimedia content, GSAT-3 (EDUSAT) was launched by a GSLV in September 2004. Its transponders and their ground coverage are specially configured to cater to the educational requirements. The satellite carries a Ku band transponder covering the Indian mainland region with 50 dBW EIRP, five Ku band spot beam transponders for south, west, central, north and north-east regional coverage with 55 dBW EIRP and six Extended C-band transponders with India coverage with 37 dBW EIRP. EDUSAT is positioned at 74 degree East longitude and is collocated with KALPANA-1 and INSAT-3.

GSAT-6

GSAT-6 (also called INSAT-4E) is a multimedia communication satellite that offers a Satellite Digital Multimedia Broadcasting (S-DMB) service across several digital multimedia terminals or consoles which can be used to provide information services to vehicles on the fly and to the mobile phones.

GSAT-7

GSAT-7 (or INSAT-4F) is a multi-band military communications satellite developed by ISRO. The Indian Navy is the user of the multi-band communication spacecraft, which has been operational since September 2013.

GSAT-8

GSAT-8 (INSAT-4G), is a high power communication satellite in the INSAT system. Weighing about 3,100 kg at lift-off, GSAT-8 is configured to carry 24 high power transponders Ku band and a two-channel GPS Aided Geo Augmented Navigation (GAGAN) payload operating in L1 and L5 bands.

GSAT 9

The GSAT-9, also known as the "South Asia  Satellite", is a geostationary  communications satellite and meteorology satellite operated by the ISRO for the South Asian Association for Regional Cooperation (SAARC) region. The satellite was launched on 5 May 2017.

GSAT-10

GSAT-10 was launched by Ariane-5ECA carrier rocket in 2012. It serves with C and Ku band transponders, and includes a navigation payload to augment GAGAN capacity.

GSAT-12

GSAT-12 configured to carry 12 Extended C-band transponders to meet the country's growing demand for transponders in a short turn-around-time. The 12 Extended C-band transponders of GSAT-12 will augment the capacity in the INSAT system for various communication services like Tele-education, Telemedicine and for Village Resource Centres (VRC).

GSAT-14

GSAT-14 was launched in January 2014 to replace the GSAT-3 satellite, which was launched in 2004.

GSAT-15

GSAT-15 is similar to GSAT-10 and is used to augment the capacity of transponders to provide more bandwidth for Direct-to-Home television and VSAT services. It was successfully launched on 10 November 2015 at 21:34:07 UTC aboard an Ariane 5 rocket, along with the ArabSat 6B satellite.

GSAT-16

GSAT-16 is the 11th Indian communication satellite meant to increase the number of transponders that in turn enhance the satellite based telecommunication, television, VSAT services in India. GSAT-16 was launched on 7 December 2014 from the Guiana Space Centre, French Guiana, by an Ariane 5 rocket.

GSAT-17

it carries 24 C-band, 2 lower C-band, 12 upper C-band, 2 CxS (C-band up/S-band down), and 1 SxC (S-band up/C-band down) transponders. It additionally carries a dedicated transponder for data relay (DRT) and search-and-rescue (SAR) services. At the time of launch, GSAT-17 was the heaviest satellite built by ISRO. The satellite was launched on 28 June 2017 aboard an Ariane 5 ECA rocket from the Guiana Space Centre in Kourou, French Guiana.

GSAT-18

GSAT-18 carries 24 C-band, 12 extended C-band, and 12 Ku-band transponders. It was launched on 5 October 2016 aboard an Ariane 5 ECA rocket from the Guiana Space Centre in Kourou, French Guiana.

GSAT-19

Launched on 5 June 2017, GSAT-19 is a communication satellite testbed for the modular I-6K satellite bus, carrying experimental technologies such as ion thrusters for manoeuvring and stabilisation, active thermal control using thermal radiators, a miniaturised inertial reference unit, indigenously produced lithium-ion batteries, and C-band traveling-wave-tube amplifiers.

GSAT-29

The GSAT-29 is a large high-throughput communication satellite that was launched on 14 November 2018 through the second developmental flight of GSLV Mark III, that placed the  satellite into its planned geosynchronous transfer orbit (GTO) over the equator. Apart from its main communication payload in Ka/Ku bands, GSAT-29 hosts few experimental payloads to mature their technology for use in future spacecraft.

Others
GSAT-7A
GSAT-11
GSAT-31
GSAT-30

Commercial Communications satellite 

 ExseedSat-1 is the first Indian commercial satellite built by Satellize (formerly known as Exseed Space). It was a communication satellite launched by SpaceX's Falcon-9 rocket on 6 December 2018.
 ExseedSat-2 (AISAT) is the second Indian commercial satellite built for Amsat India launched on the fourth stage of the PSLV-C45 mission.

Indian Communication Satellites Launch Log

Upcoming launches 
GSAT-20
GSAT-22
GSAT-23

See also

 Indian Remote Sensing Satellites
List of Indian satellites

References 

ISRO programs

Communications satellite constellations
1983 establishments in India